Carlos Sánchez (born 25 July 1988 in Loja, Ecuador) is an Ecuadorian boxer. He competed in the 2011 Pan American Games and in the Men's welterweight event at the 2012 Summer Olympics but lost to Irish Adam Nolan in the first round.

References

1988 births
Living people
People from Loja, Ecuador
Boxers at the 2011 Pan American Games
Boxers at the 2012 Summer Olympics
Olympic boxers of Ecuador
Pan American Games competitors for Ecuador
Ecuadorian male boxers
Welterweight boxers
21st-century Ecuadorian people